is a 1968 Japanese ero guro film directed by Teruo Ishii and distributed by Toei. The film, which can be classified as belonging to a subgenre of pink films, is considered a precursor to Toei's ventures into the "pinky violent" style of filmmaking seen in the early 1970s. It was followed by Shogun's Sadism in 1976.

Cast
 Teruo Yoshida
 Fumio Watanabe
 Kinji Nakamura
 Masumi Tachibana
 Ken Sawaaki
 Yuki Kagawa
 Miki Obana
 Asao Koike

Release
In May 2005, Shogun's Joy of Torture was released on region 1 DVD.

References

Sources

External links 
 
 

1968 films
1960s exploitation films
Films directed by Teruo Ishii
Toei Pinky Violence
Toei Company films
1960s pornographic films
1960s Japanese films